Street Lights is a 2018 Indian Malayalam-language thriller film directed by cinematographer Shamdat in his directorial debut. The film is produced by Mammootty under his banner Playhouse Motion Pictures and starring himself alongside a different supporting cast in each language. The film features Soubin Shahir, Dharmajan Bolgatty, Hareesh Perumanna, and Lijomol Jose, who play pivotal roles in Malayalam. The film was simultaneously shot in Tamil with Prithvi Rajan, Pandi, Pandiarajan, and Sreeram playing pivotal roles.

The principal photography began on 24 March 2017 and was conducted in Kochi, Pollachi, and Chennai. Malayalam version was released on 26 January 2018.

Plot 

This film begins with a chase scene where two security guards are chasing two thieves wearing masks, catching up to them only to be beaten down by a third thief. They return to their hideout to reveal that they were unable to crack the safe but were able to yank off a rare Rs. 5 crore (or $724,000) necklace off of the homeowner’s neck. The homeowners call their nephew James, who is a police detective, investigates it. The thieves are chased by the police and Sachi the second thief hides it in a bag. The bag is later taken by Mani, a boy. Soon after the chase James reveals that Murugan the third thief is a notorious criminal with a grudge on James as he killed Murugan's elder brother Manimaran. Finally the necklace reaches James and James catches Murugan and kills him.

Cast

Malayalam version:
 Mammootty as CI James
 Soubin Shahir as Subin
 Lijomol Jose as Remya
 Gayathri Krishnaa as Jenny
 Hareesh Perumanna as Raj
 Dharmajan Bolgatty as Sachi
 Jude Anthany Joseph as Peeyush
 Rajendran as Manimaran
 Stunt Silva as Murugan/Murugeshan
 Adhish Praveen as Mani
 Rony David as SI Issac
 Rajasekharan as SI Moorthy
 Nandhu as Remya's Father
 Joy Mathew as Simon Mundakal
 Semmalar Annam as Malar, mother of Mani (Aadhish)
 Sudhi Koppa as Thotti Sibi
 Neena Kurup as Maria
 Sohan Seenulal
 Daya Ashwathy
Tamil version:
 Prithvi Rajan
 Lijomol Jose
 Pandi
 Sree Raam
 Pandiarajan
 Manobala
 Rajendran
 Stunt Silva
 Rajasekharan

Production

Development
Cinematographer Shamdat is marking his directorial debut. Eager to direct a film, he watched many short films, and one of them led him into contacting its maker Fawaz Mohamed. After Shamdat told his idea to Fawaz, Fawaz developed the content  into a story within a week. In 2016, Shamdat narrated the story to Mammootty at the sets of The Great Father, which he agreed to act and to produce. Originally scripted in Malayalam, the story featuring a certain Tamil-speaking characters and portions to be set in Tamil Nadu prompted the makers to make the film in Tamil also. Shamdat's initial idea of different production of film, as first in Malayalam and Tamil thereafter, was advanced to the simultaneous filming of both versions, since Mammootty was ready to finance also the Tamil version. Dialogues for Tamil version were written by Shamdat himself, while Malayalam dialogues along with script are credited to Fawaz Mohamed, who is also debutant. Shamdat does not include the film in any specific genre such as action, crime or suspense, and wants to call it an "entertainment thriller".

Casting and filming
The principal photography began on 24 March 2017 in Kochi, planned to be completed in a single schedule. Shamdat's brother Sadat Sainudeen was the cinematography. Mammootty had allotted his 20 days of date. An accident occurred during filming of a fight sequence held at Mattancherry, causing Vishnu Unnikrishnan an injury to his right hand wrist. He was prescribed two weeks' rest by the doctors and, subsequently, was replaced by Dharmajan Bolgatty. Lijomol Jose was offered a role by Shamdat during the shooting of her film Kattappanayile Rithwik Roshan. In Tamil version, a prominent role is played by Prithvi Rajan, who is placed at the way of a probe conducted by Mammootty, with few collaboration scenes between them, while he also leads a romantic comedy track, paired with Lijomol's character. Rajan's father, Pandiarajan, also plays an important role. Stunt choreographer Stunt Silva  was cast for the antagonist, whose real looks and style were retained for the character.

In the case of filming, Tamil scenes were shot first, followed by Malayalam. In order to minimize the production cost and expedite the filming, only perfected shots based on finalized script were taken, and big monitors and crew were avoided. Filming was done with camera hidden at places like bus stands. Sound design was by Renganaath Ravee; sounds taken from day and night were used in the film. Tamil version is based in Chennai. According to the director, both versions were treated differently, in such a way that Malayalam features more humour while Tamil a serious narrative. Filming of both films completed in 35 days. In November 2017, the makers also planned to dub the film into Telugu. Mammootty himself dubbed in three languages.

Release
In November 2017, it was reported that release of the film is rescheduled to January 2018 because of the Telugu dubbing works. Malayalam version was released on 26 January 2018 in India and GCC countries.

Soundtrack
Adarsh Abraham who was a programmer under Ouseppachan debuted as  composer in the film, which comprises four songs. Neha Nair and Yakzan Gary Pereira duo composed film's score.

References

External links
  (Malayalam)
 (Tamil)
 
 

2018 films
2010s Tamil-language films
Indian multilingual films
Indian thriller films
Films shot in Kochi
Films shot in Pollachi
Films shot in Chennai
2018 multilingual films
2018 thriller films
2010s Malayalam-language films